Burglars is a 1930 German musical comedy film directed by Hanns Schwarz and starring Ralph Arthur Roberts, Lilian Harvey, Willy Fritsch, and Heinz Rühmann. It is also known in English by the alternative title Murder For Sale. It is based on the French play "Guignol le cambrioleur" by Louis Verneuil, who co-wrote the screenplay. A French-language version, titled Caught in the Act, was filmed at the same time. The film was intended by the studio UFA as a follow-up to the hit musical The Three from the Filling Station.

The film's set were designed by the art director Erich Kettelhut. It was shot at the Babelsberg Studios in Berlin with location filming also taking place in Paris.

Plot
A young wife married to a much older toymaker is seduced by a dashing young thief who plans to rob them.

Cast
 Ralph Arthur Roberts as Dumontier
 Lilian Harvey as Reneé
 Willy Fritsch as Durand
 Heinz Rühmann as Sérigny
 Margarethe Koeppke as Mimi
 Oskar Sima as Der Diener
 Gertrud Wolle as Hortense
 Kurt Gerron as 1. Polizeikommisar
 Paul Henckels as 2. Polizeikommisar

References

External links
 
 

1930 films
Films of the Weimar Republic
1930s German-language films
German multilingual films
Films based on works by Louis Verneuil
Films directed by Hanns Schwarz
1930 musical comedy films
UFA GmbH films
Films shot at Babelsberg Studios
German black-and-white films
German musical comedy films
1930 multilingual films
1930s German films